The Lirung monitor (Varanus lirungensis) is a species of monitor lizards on the Talaud Islands in Indonesia. It was recently discovered by André Koch, a German scientist from the Zoological Research Museum Alexander Koenig in Bonn, during a joint German-Indonesian research project. Koch stated the discovery was important, "because it illustrates the high diversity of monitor lizards in Indonesia."

Description
The known Lirung monitor specimen has a total length of about 80 cm. Its belly is yellow-grey with some darker cross bands.

References

Reptiles of Indonesia
Reptiles described in 2009
Varanus